Colostethus dysprosium is a species of frog in the family Dendrobatidae. It is endemic to Antioquia, Colombia. Its natural habitats are rivers, freshwater marshes and intermittent freshwater marshes.

References

Colostethus
Amphibians of Colombia
Endemic fauna of Colombia
Taxa named by Juan A. Rivero
Taxa named by Marco Antonio Serna Díaz
Amphibians described in 2000
Taxonomy articles created by Polbot